Shoaib Akhtar, a Pakistani former cricketer, took 16 five-wicket hauls during his career in international cricket. A five-wicket haul (also known as a "five–for" or "fifer") refers to a bowler taking five or more wickets in a single innings. This is regarded as a notable achievement, and as of 2014 only 41 bowlers have taken more than 15 five-wicket hauls at international level in their cricketing careers. A fast bowler who represented his country from 1997 to 2011, BBC described Shoaib as "one of the fastest bowlers ever to play the game".

Shoaib made his Test debut in 1997 against the West Indies at the Rawalpindi Cricket Stadium, where he took two wickets in the first innings. His first Test five-wicket haul came the following year against South Africa, a match Pakistan won at the Kingsmead Cricket Ground, Durban. Shoaib took a pair of five-wicket hauls against New Zealand at the Basin Reserve, Wellington in December 2003. His career-best figures for an innings were 6 wickets for 11 runs against New Zealand at the Gaddafi Stadium, Lahore, in May 2002. Shoaib took twelve five-wicket hauls in Test cricket and ten or more wickets per match twice in the format.

Having made his One Day International (ODI) debut in October 1998 against Zimbabwe at the Harare Sports Club, Shoaib's first five-wicket haul came against New Zealand in 2001, a match Pakistan won at the Eden Park, Auckland. His best bowling performance in ODIs was 6 wickets for 16 runs against New Zealand at the National Stadium, Karachi, in December 2001. Shoaib played 19 Twenty20 Internationals for Pakistan, however he never took a five-wicket haul in this format. He retired from international cricket after the 2011 Cricket World Cup. As of 2014, he is sixth in the list of five-wicket haul takers for Pakistan, all formats of the game combined.

Key

Tests

One Day Internationals

References

External links
 
 
 

Akhtar, Shoaib
Akhtar